Sonnet 9 is one of 154 sonnets written by the English playwright and poet William Shakespeare. It is a procreation sonnet within the Fair Youth sequence.

Because Sonnet 10 pursues and amplifies the theme of "hatred against the world" which appears rather suddenly in the final couplet of this sonnet, one may well say that Sonnet 9 and Sonnet 10 form a diptych, even though the form of linkage is different from the case of Sonnets 5 and 6 or Sonnets 15 and 16.

Structure

Sonnet 9 is an English or Shakespearean sonnet. Sonnets of this type comprise 14 lines, containing three quatrains and a final couplet, with the rhyme scheme ABAB CDCD EFEF GG. They are composed in iambic pentameter a metrical line based on five pairs of metrically weak/strong syllabic positions. Ambiguity can exist in the scansion of some lines. The weak words (lacking any tonic stress) beginning the poem allow the first line to be scanned as a regular pentameter:
×  /   ×   /    ×  /  ×  / ×    / 
Is it for fear to wet a widow's eye (9.1)
/ = ictus, a metrically strong syllabic position. × = nonictus.

...or as containing an initial reversal:
/  ×   ×   /    ×  /  ×  / ×    / 
Is it for fear to wet a widow's eye (9.1)

Synopsis and analysis
Sonnet 9 argues again that the so-called "Fair Youth" should marry and father children. The poet first asks if the reason he has remained single was a "fear" that, if he were to die, he would leave some woman a widow and in tears ("to wet a widow's eye"). The poet also exclaims, "Ah," a musing and a sigh before the wailing to come. If the "Fair Youth" were to die without children, then the world would lament his absence as might a wife without a mate. The public world would be his widow and forever weep because he has left behind no figure of himself.

Shakespeare argues that the young man should at least leave his widow with child before he dies, and that at least a widow will always have the image of her children to console her after her loss. Shakespeare then talks in the language of economics, concluding that if beauty is not put to (procreative) use and is hoarded as if by a non-yielding, sexual miser ("kept unused"), he will destroy it. The sonnet ends with the scathing declaration that if the young man does not marry and have children, he is committing "murderous shame" upon himself. Since no outgoing "love" dwells in his "bosom", he is like Narcissus, guilty of self-love.

References

Further reading
Baldwin, T. W. (1950). On the Literary Genetics of Shakspeare's Sonnets. University of Illinois Press, Urbana.
Hubler, Edwin (1952). The Sense of Shakespeare's Sonnets. Princeton University Press, Princeton.
Schoenfeldt, Michael (2007). The Sonnets: The Cambridge Companion to Shakespeare's Poetry. Patrick Cheney, Cambridge University Press, Cambridge.

External links

Paraphrase of sonnet in modern language
Analysis of the sonnet

British poems
Sonnets by William Shakespeare